The Penske PC4 was a Formula One car used by Team Penske during the 1976 and was driven to victory in that year's Austrian Grand Prix by John Watson, scoring the last win for an American-licensed constructor in a F1 race. It was used for most of the following season by ATS Racing and Interscope Racing also used the PC4 for two races that year.

Development
The Penske PC4 was designed by Geoff Ferris. It featured a low monocoque tub with hip radiators. After a poor debut in Sweden, its aerodynamics were revised and the wheelbase extended. Three chassis were built by Team Penske during the course of the 1976 season.

Racing history
Team Penske used the PC3 for the first six races of the season, but for the Swedish Grand Prix the PC4 was introduced. The team's sole driver, John Watson, qualified the new car 17th on the grid but crashed on the first lap of the race when its throttle became stuck. Following aerodynamic revisions and a lengthening of the wheel base, the PC4 proved to be quite competitive.  Watson fared much better at the following race in France, when he took the car to third place, having started eighth. He followed this up with another third in Britain. He scored both his and Penske's maiden win in Austria, having qualified second. Another point was scored in the United States, where Watson finished sixth. 

A total of 18 points were scored with the PC4, and with two points scored with the PC3, the Penske team placed fifth in the Constructor's Championship, with Watson 7th in the Driver's Championship.  Penske withdrew from Formula One at the end of the season, the team opting to focus on Indycar racing.

ATS Racing
German industrialist Günter Schmid brought the Penske PC4 chassis for his newly formed ATS Racing team, set up to participate in the 1977 Formula One season. The team initially fielded a single entry for Jean-Pierre Jarier. He scored a point for sixth place in the team's debut race in the United States. His ninth on the grid at that race was the team's best qualifying with the PC4, which would usually place in the lower half of the grid.  The team expanded to two entries later in the season and Hans Heyer made a one-off appearance in the German Grand Prix, famously driving despite failing to qualify. Hans Binder took over for the next three races, qualifying for two of them. ATS discarded its PC4s following the introduction of its own chassis, the ATS HS1, for the final three races of the year.

Interscope Racing
Ted Field's Interscope Racing ran a PC4 for Danny Ongais at the tail end of the 1977 season. Ongais managed a best of seventh from the two races entered.

Complete Formula One World Championship results
(key) (Results in bold indicate pole position; results in italics indicate fastest lap.) 

 2 points scored in 1976 with the Penske PC3.

Notes

References

Penske Formula One cars